The Pentax K-m (called K2000 in U.S.) is a 10.2 megapixel digital single-lens reflex camera, announced on September 22, 2008 at the 2008 photokina trade show along with the DA-L series of lightweight, inexpensive lenses.  It was discontinued in November 2009, being replaced by the more recent Pentax K-x.

The K-m is considered a compact and entry-level model.  It is significantly lighter than other Pentax DSLRs, lacks the weather sealing of the contemporaneous K200D and K20D models, and is intended to be sold with lightweight DA-L-series lenses.  It does offer some improvements over the K200D, however, notably a maximum sensitivity increased from ISO 1600 to ISO 3200 and a slightly faster burst mode.

The MSRP of the Pentax K2000 is $699 with DA-L 18-55mm 3.5-5.6 kit lens and AF200FG external flash unit.

See also
Pentax K1000
Pentax K-x

References

External links 
 PENTAX K-m SPECIAL SITE, Pentax

K2000
Cameras introduced in 2008
Pentax K-mount cameras